Naturally occurring barium (56Ba) is a mix of six stable isotopes and one very long-lived radioactive primordial isotope, barium-130, identified as being unstable by geochemical means (from analysis of the presence of its daughter xenon-130 in rocks) in 2001. This nuclide decays by double electron capture (absorbing two electrons and emitting two neutrinos), with a half-life of (0.5–2.7)×1021 years (about 1011 times the age of the universe).

There are a total of thirty-three known radioisotopes in addition to 130Ba. The longest-lived of these is 133Ba, which has a half-life of 10.51 years. All other radioisotopes have half-lives shorter than two weeks. The longest-lived isomer is 133mBa, which has a half-life of 38.9 hours. The shorter-lived 137mBa (half-life 2.55 minutes) arises as the decay product of the common fission product caesium-137.

Barium-114 is predicted to undergo cluster decay, emitting a nucleus of stable 12C to produce 102Sn. However this decay is not yet observed; the upper limit on the branching ratio of such decay is 0.0034%.

List of isotopes 

|-
| rowspan=4|114Ba
| rowspan=4 style="text-align:right" | 56
| rowspan=4 style="text-align:right" | 58
| rowspan=4|113.95068(15)
| rowspan=4|530(230) ms[0.43(+30−15) s]
| β+, p (99.59%)
| 113Xe
| rowspan=4|0+
| rowspan=4|
| rowspan=4|
|-
| α (.37%)
| 110Xe
|-
| β+ (.04%)
| 114Cs
|-
| CD (<.0034%)
| 102Sn, 12C
|-
| rowspan=2|115Ba
| rowspan=2 style="text-align:right" | 56
| rowspan=2 style="text-align:right" | 59
| rowspan=2|114.94737(64)#
| rowspan=2|0.45(5) s
| β+
| 115Cs
| rowspan=2|(5/2+)#
| rowspan=2|
| rowspan=2|
|-
| β+, p
| 114Xe
|-
| rowspan=2|116Ba
| rowspan=2 style="text-align:right" | 56
| rowspan=2 style="text-align:right" | 60
| rowspan=2|115.94138(43)#
| rowspan=2|1.3(2) s
| β+
| 116Cs
| rowspan=2|0+
| rowspan=2|
| rowspan=2|
|-
| β+, p
| 115Xe
|-
| rowspan=3|117Ba
| rowspan=3 style="text-align:right" | 56
| rowspan=3 style="text-align:right" | 61
| rowspan=3|116.93850(32)#
| rowspan=3|1.75(7) s
| β+
| 117Cs
| rowspan=3|(3/2)(+#)
| rowspan=3|
| rowspan=3|
|-
| β+, α
| 113I
|-
| β+, p
| 116Xe
|-
| rowspan=2|118Ba
| rowspan=2 style="text-align:right" | 56
| rowspan=2 style="text-align:right" | 62
| rowspan=2|117.93304(21)#
| rowspan=2|5.2(2) s
| β+
| 118Cs
| rowspan=2|0+
| rowspan=2|
| rowspan=2|
|-
| β+, p
| 117Xe
|-
| rowspan=2|119Ba
| rowspan=2 style="text-align:right" | 56
| rowspan=2 style="text-align:right" | 63
| rowspan=2|118.93066(21)
| rowspan=2|5.4(3) s
| β+
| 119Cs
| rowspan=2|(5/2+)
| rowspan=2|
| rowspan=2|
|-
| β+, p
| 118Xe
|-
| 120Ba
| style="text-align:right" | 56
| style="text-align:right" | 64
| 119.92604(32)
| 24(2) s
| β+
| 120Cs
| 0+
|
|
|-
| rowspan=2|121Ba
| rowspan=2 style="text-align:right" | 56
| rowspan=2 style="text-align:right" | 65
| rowspan=2|120.92405(15)
| rowspan=2|29.7(15) s
| β+ (99.98%)
| 121Cs
| rowspan=2|5/2(+)
| rowspan=2|
| rowspan=2|
|-
| β+, p (.02%)
| 120Xe
|-
| 122Ba
| style="text-align:right" | 56
| style="text-align:right" | 66
| 121.91990(3)
| 1.95(15) min
| β+
| 122Cs
| 0+
|
|
|-
| 123Ba
| style="text-align:right" | 56
| style="text-align:right" | 67
| 122.918781(13)
| 2.7(4) min
| β+
| 123Cs
| 5/2(+)
|
|
|-
| 124Ba
| style="text-align:right" | 56
| style="text-align:right" | 68
| 123.915094(13)
| 11.0(5) min
| β+
| 124Cs
| 0+
|
|
|-
| 125Ba
| style="text-align:right" | 56
| style="text-align:right" | 69
| 124.914473(12)
| 3.5(4) min
| β+
| 125Cs
| 1/2(+#)
|
|
|-
| 126Ba
| style="text-align:right" | 56
| style="text-align:right" | 70
| 125.911250(13)
| 100(2) min
| β+
| 126Cs
| 0+
|
|
|-
| 127Ba
| style="text-align:right" | 56
| style="text-align:right" | 71
| 126.911094(12)
| 12.7(4) min
| β+
| 127Cs
| 1/2+
|
|
|-
| style="text-indent:1em" | 127mBa
| colspan="3" style="text-indent:2em" | 80.33(12) keV
| 1.9(2) s
| IT
| 127Ba
| 7/2−
|
|
|-
| 128Ba
| style="text-align:right" | 56
| style="text-align:right" | 72
| 127.908318(11)
| 2.43(5) d
| β+
| 128Cs
| 0+
|
|
|-
| 129Ba
| style="text-align:right" | 56
| style="text-align:right" | 73
| 128.908679(12)
| 2.23(11) h
| β+
| 129Cs
| 1/2+
|
|
|-
| rowspan=2 style="text-indent:1em" | 129mBa
| rowspan=2 colspan="3" style="text-indent:2em" | 8.42(6) keV
| rowspan=2|2.16(2) h
| β+
| 129Cs
| rowspan=2|7/2+#
| rowspan=2|
| rowspan=2|
|-
| IT
| 129Ba
|-
| 130Ba
| style="text-align:right" | 56
| style="text-align:right" | 74
| 129.9063208(30)
| 1.6(±1.1)×1021 y
| Double EC
| 130Xe
| 0+
| 0.00106(1)
|
|-
| style="text-indent:1em" | 130mBa
| colspan="3" style="text-indent:2em" | 2475.12(18) keV
| 9.54(14) ms
| IT
| 130Ba
| 8−
|
|
|-
| 131Ba
| style="text-align:right" | 56
| style="text-align:right" | 75
| 130.906941(3)
| 11.50(6) d
| β+
| 131Cs
| 1/2+
|
|
|-
| style="text-indent:1em" | 131mBa
| colspan="3" style="text-indent:2em" | 187.14(12) keV
| 14.6(2) min
| IT
| 131Ba
| 9/2−
|
|
|-
| 132Ba
| style="text-align:right" | 56
| style="text-align:right" | 76
| 131.9050613(11)
| colspan=3 align=center|Observationally Stable
| 0+
| 0.00101(1)
|
|-
| 133Ba
| style="text-align:right" | 56
| style="text-align:right" | 77
| 132.9060075(11)
| 10.51(5) y
| EC
| 133Cs
| 1/2+
| 
| 
|-
| rowspan=2 style="text-indent:1em" | 133mBa
| rowspan=2 colspan="3" style="text-indent:2em" | 288.247(9) keV
| rowspan=2|38.9(1) h
| IT (99.99%)
| 133Ba
| rowspan=2|11/2−
| rowspan=2|
| rowspan=2|
|- 
| EC (.0096%)
| 133Cs
|-
| 134Ba
| style="text-align:right" | 56
| style="text-align:right" | 78
| 133.9045084(4)
| colspan=3 align=center|Stable
| 0+
| 0.02417(18)
|
|-
| 135Ba
| style="text-align:right" | 56
| style="text-align:right" | 79
| 134.9056886(4)
| colspan=3 align=center|Stable
| 3/2+
| 0.06592(12)
|
|-
| style="text-indent:1em" | 135mBa
| colspan="3" style="text-indent:2em" | 268.22(2) keV
| 28.7(2) h
| IT
| 135Ba
| 11/2−
|
|
|-
| 136Ba
| style="text-align:right" | 56
| style="text-align:right" | 80
| 135.9045759(4)
| colspan=3 align=center|Stable
| 0+
| 0.07854(24)
|
|-
| style="text-indent:1em" | 136mBa
| colspan="3" style="text-indent:2em" | 2030.466(18) keV
| 308.4(19) ms
| IT
| 136Ba
| 7−
|
|
|-
| 137Ba
| style="text-align:right" | 56
| style="text-align:right" | 81
| 136.9058274(5)
| colspan=3 align=center|Stable
| 3/2+
| 0.11232(24)
|
|-
| style="text-indent:1em" | 137m1Ba
| colspan="3" style="text-indent:2em" | 661.659(3) keV
| 2.552(1) min
| IT
| 137Ba
| 11/2−
|
|
|-
| style="text-indent:1em" | 137m2Ba
| colspan="3" style="text-indent:2em" | 2349.1(4) keV
| 0.59(10) µs
|
|
| (17/2−)
|
|
|-
| 138Ba
| style="text-align:right" | 56
| style="text-align:right" | 82
| 137.9052472(5)
| colspan=3 align=center|Stable
| 0+
| 0.71698(42)
|
|-
| style="text-indent:1em" | 138mBa
| colspan="3" style="text-indent:2em" | 2090.54(6) keV
| 800(100) ns
|
|
| 6+
|
|
|-
| 139Ba
| style="text-align:right" | 56
| style="text-align:right" | 83
| 138.9088413(5)
| 83.06(28) min
| β−
| 139La
| 7/2−
|
|
|-
| 140Ba
| style="text-align:right" | 56
| style="text-align:right" | 84
| 139.910605(9)
| 12.752(3) d
| β−
| 140La
| 0+
|
|
|-
| 141Ba
| style="text-align:right" | 56
| style="text-align:right" | 85
| 140.914411(9)
| 18.27(7) min
| β−
| 141La
| 3/2−
|
|
|-
| 142Ba
| style="text-align:right" | 56
| style="text-align:right" | 86
| 141.916453(7)
| 10.6(2) min
| β−
| 142La
| 0+
|
|
|-
| 143Ba
| style="text-align:right" | 56
| style="text-align:right" | 87
| 142.920627(14)
| 14.5(3) s
| β−
| 143La
| 5/2−
|
|
|-
| 144Ba
| style="text-align:right" | 56
| style="text-align:right" | 88
| 143.922953(14)
| 11.5(2) s
| β−
| 144La
| 0+
|
|
|-
| 145Ba
| style="text-align:right" | 56
| style="text-align:right" | 89
| 144.92763(8)
| 4.31(16) s
| β−
| 145La
| 5/2−
|
|
|-
| rowspan=2|146Ba
| rowspan=2 style="text-align:right" | 56
| rowspan=2 style="text-align:right" | 90
| rowspan=2|145.93022(8)
| rowspan=2|2.22(7) s
| β− (99.98%)
| 146La
| rowspan=2|0+
| rowspan=2|
| rowspan=2|
|-
| β−, n (.02%)
| 145La
|-
| rowspan=2|147Ba
| rowspan=2 style="text-align:right" | 56
| rowspan=2 style="text-align:right" | 91
| rowspan=2|146.93495(22)#
| rowspan=2|0.893(1) s
| β− (99.94%)
| 147La
| rowspan=2|(3/2+)
| rowspan=2|
| rowspan=2|
|-
| β−, n (.06%)
| 146La
|-
| rowspan=2|148Ba
| rowspan=2 style="text-align:right" | 56
| rowspan=2 style="text-align:right" | 92
| rowspan=2|147.93772(9)
| rowspan=2|0.612(17) s
| β− (99.6%)
| 148La
| rowspan=2|0+
| rowspan=2|
| rowspan=2|
|-
| β−, n (.4%)
| 147La
|-
| rowspan=2|149Ba
| rowspan=2 style="text-align:right" | 56
| rowspan=2 style="text-align:right" | 93
| rowspan=2|148.94258(21)#
| rowspan=2|344(7) ms
| β− (99.57%)
| 149La
| rowspan=2|3/2−#
| rowspan=2| 
| rowspan=2|
|-
| β−, n (.43%)
| 148La
|-
| rowspan=2|150Ba
| rowspan=2 style="text-align:right" | 56
| rowspan=2 style="text-align:right" | 94
| rowspan=2|149.94568(43)#
| rowspan=2|300 ms
| β−
| 150La
| rowspan=2|0+
| rowspan=2|
| rowspan=2|
|-
| β−, n (rare)
| 149La
|-
| 151Ba
| style="text-align:right" | 56
| style="text-align:right" | 95
| 150.95081(43)#
| 200# ms [>300 ns]
| β−
| 151La
| 3/2−#
|
|
|-
| 152Ba
| style="text-align:right" | 56
| style="text-align:right" | 96
| 151.95427(54)#
| 100# ms
| β−
| 152La
| 0+
|
|
|-
| 153Ba
| style="text-align:right" | 56
| style="text-align:right" | 97
| 152.95961(86)#
| 80# ms
| β−
| 153La
| 5/2−#
|
|

References 

 Isotope masses from:

 Isotopic compositions and standard atomic masses from:

 Half-life, spin, and isomer data selected from the following sources.

 Half-life of 130Ba from:

 
Barium
Barium